Menderjan (also Romanized as Menderjān) is a village in Kaveh Ahangar Rural District, in the Central District of Chadegan County, Isfahan Province, Iran. At the 2006 census, its population was 974, in 232 families.

References 

Populated places in Chadegan County